Cecil Thomas Madigan (15 October 1889 – 14 January 1947) was an Australian explorer and geologist, academic, aerial surveyor, meteorologist, author and officer of the British army. He was born in Renmark, South Australia. His family had associations with William Benjamin Chaffey.

Biography 
Born to contractor and fruitgrower Thomas Madigan and Mary Dixie (née Finey) a teacher, Cecil Madigan was the oldest of two sons and two daughters. He was raised by his mother as his father had died in the Kalgoorlie, Western Australian Goldfields. He attended Prince Alfred College in Adelaide, the University of Adelaide, and the South Australian School of Mining and Industry. He won a Rhodes scholarship in 1911 to study geology at Magdalen College, Oxford, but deferred the appointment as he was invited by Sir Douglas Mawson to go as meteorologist on the Australasian Antarctic Expedition. In December 1911 the party left Hobart on board the SY Aurora. In January 1912 they reached Commonwealth Bay in Adelie Land, Antarctica, where they set up a collection of buildings subsequently known as Mawson's Huts. From there he led several expeditions into uncharted regions of Adelie Land and King George V Land. These expeditions gathered vital information about the presence of coal in Antarctica. He was awarded the Polar Medal upon their return. 
Madigan later served with the Royal Engineers in France during the First World War. He saw action at the Battle of Loos where he was wounded, and the Battle of the Somme.

Throughout the 1930s, Madigan participated in numerous aerial surveys of the "trackless areas" of Central Australia, during which time he named the Simpson Desert after the president of the South Australian branch of the Royal Geographical Society of Australasia -- Alfred Allen Simpson. In 1937 he confirmed that the Boxhole Crater is a meteoric impact crater. In 1939 he led the first major expedition across the Simpson Desert.  Although he was not the first to cross the desert, he has become known as the last of the "classic" explorers of central Australia. 
For many years he worked as a lecturer in geology at the University of Adelaide.

Family 

He married Wynnis Knight Wollaston, a native of Adelaide, Australia, whilst he was in London in 1915. The daughter of Cecil Madigan is renowned Australian sculptor Rosemary Madigan, and her daughter is leading harpist Alice Giles.

Descendants include David Madigan (deceased) and his two children, Sir Russell Madigan (deceased) and his five children, Neith Madigan (deceased) and her four children, Robourne Madigan (deceased), Rosemary Madigan (deceased) and her three children.

He died of Coronary Vascular disease in Adelaide, on 14 January 1947.

See also
Centre points of Australia
Boxhole crater
Huckitta meteorite

Publications
 1944 - Central Australia. Oxford University Press: Melbourne.
 1946 - Crossing the Dead Heart. Georgian House: Melbourne. 
 2012 - Madigan's Account: The Mawson Expedition : the Antarctic Diaries of C.T. Madigan, 1911-1914 Wellington Bridge Press.

References

1889 births
1947 deaths
Alumni of Magdalen College, Oxford
Australasian Antarctic Expedition
Australian explorers
20th-century Australian geologists
20th-century Australian non-fiction writers
Australian Rhodes Scholars
Explorers of Australia
People educated at Prince Alfred College
People from Renmark, South Australia
University of Adelaide alumni